The Agora (plural Agorot ; , .) is a denomination of the currency of Israel. The Israeli currency – the Israeli new shekel (ILS)– is divided into 100 agorot.

History
The name agora refers to the subunits of three distinct Israeli currencies.

This name was used for the first time in 1960, when the Israeli government decided to change the subdivision of the Israeli pound (lira) from 1,000 prutah to 100 agorot due to the currency's depreciation. The name was suggested by the Academy of the Hebrew Language, and was borrowed from the Hebrew Bible:

The term "piece of silver" appears in Hebrew as "agorat kessef".

In 1980 the Israeli pound was replaced by the shekel at a rate of IL10 per IS 1. The new subdivision of the shekel was named agora ẖadaša ("new agora"). There were 100 new agorot in 1 shekel. The high rate of inflation in Israel in the early 1980s forced the Israeli government to change the Israeli currency once again in 1985. The new shekel was introduced at a rate of 1000 S per 1 NS. The name agora was used once again for its subdivision. This time the term "new" was avoided, in order to prevent confusion with the older subdivision (the pre-1980 agora was long since out of circulation).
Currently, the term agora refers to the 100th part of the new shekel. There are coins of 10 and 50 agorot, though the 50 agorot coin bears the inscription: " New Shekel".

A coin of 1 agora was in use until April 1, 1991 and a coin of 5 agorot was in use until January 1, 2008 when the Bank of Israel decided to cease production. This was due to the costs spent on its production which considerably exceeded the coin's value. Today, when paying in cash, the price must be rounded to the nearest multiple of 10 agorot. When buying several items, the rounding is done for the total sum. There is no rounding when paying with cheques, credit cards or bank orders.

Issues

Israeli pound

Old Israeli shekel 

 Note that all dates on Israeli coins are given in the Hebrew calendar and are written in Hebrew numerals.

Israeli new shekel

 Note that all dates on Israeli coins are given in the Hebrew calendar and are written in Hebrew numerals.

See also
 10 agorot controversy

References

External links
 Bank of Israel catalogue of Israeli currency since 1948 
 Israeli Agora coins with pictures

Agora